CHKB may refer to:

 Choline kinase beta, a human gene
 Christian Historical Voters' League, a Dutch conservative Protestant political party.